Berhanu or Birhanu is a male given name of Ethiopian origin that may refer to

Berhanu Alemu (born 1982), Ethiopian middle-distance runner
Birhanu Bayeh (born 1938), Ethiopian foreign minister during the Derg
Birhanu Bogale (born 1986), Ethiopian footballer
Berhanu Dinka (1935–2013), Ethiopian diplomat and economist
Birhan Getahun (born 1991), Ethiopian steeplechase runner
Berhanu Girma (born 1986), Ethiopian marathon runner
Berhanu Kebede (born 1956), Ethiopian ambassador
Berhanu Nega (born 1958), Ethiopian politician and Mayor of Addis Ababa
Berhanu Zerihun (1933/4–1987), Ethiopian writer
Dejene Berhanu (1980–2010), Ethiopian long-distance runner
Girma Berhanu (born 1960), Ethiopian cross country runner
Hilina Berhanu Degefa, Ethiopian women's rights activist

Amharic-language names